Taha Zareei (born 20 November 1995) is an Iranian professional football player currently playing for the Portuguese club SC Vianense.

Career

Leixões

2015–16
On 3 July 2015, Zareei signed a two-year contract with Leixões S.C. in the Portuguese LigaPro. Zareei made his professional debut in Portugal for Leixões in a league match against FC Porto B on 26 August 2015. Leixões won 2–0 and Zareei was awarded man of the match. Taha made his second start of the season on 30 April 2016 in a 0–0 draw against Famalicão. In the 2015–16 season, Zareei made 4 appearances in all competitions keeping 2 clean sheets and conceding 6 goals.

Career statistics

Club

References

External sources
 Profile at LeixoesSC.pt
 
 Taha Zareei at ZeroZero

Living people
1995 births
Iranian footballers
Iranian expatriate footballers
Esteghlal F.C. players
Associação Naval 1º de Maio players
Leixões S.C. players
Leça F.C. players
SC Vianense players
Liga Portugal 2 players
Association football goalkeepers
Iranian expatriate sportspeople in Portugal
Expatriate footballers in Portugal